Lee Anderson (born 6 January 1967) is a British Conservative  politician who has been the Member of Parliament (MP) for Ashfield in Nottinghamshire since 2019. 

He has been the Deputy Chairman of the Conservative Party since February 2023. Prior to his parliamentary career, he was a coal miner and worked for Citizens Advice, before serving as Labour councillor in Ashfield from 2015. He defected to the Conservative Party in 2018 and served as a councillor in Mansfield from 2019 to 2021 alongside his duties as an MP.

Early life and career
Anderson was born in Nottinghamshire, attending John Davies Primary School and Ashfield School. His father was a coal miner. Anderson worked as a coal miner for ten years, and then volunteered and eventually worked for Citizens Advice for another decade. Afterwards, he worked in hostels supporting homeless care leavers.

Local political career
Anderson was a longtime member of the Labour Party and was elected as a councillor in the 2015 Ashfield District Council election, representing Huthwaite and Brierley ward. He was suspended in February 2018 by the local branch of the Labour Party after receiving a community protection warning by the council for using boulders to block members of the Traveller community from "setting up camp at a site in the area". The following month, Anderson defected to the Conservative Party, which he stated was a response to the "takeover" of the Labour Party by the "hard-left", particularly through the left-wing political organisation Momentum. He was elected as a Conservative councillor on Mansfield District Council, representing the Oakham ward between 2019 and 2021.

Parliamentary career

2019 election campaign 
In July 2019, Anderson was selected as the Conservative candidate for Ashfield for the 2019 general election. He supported Brexit in the 2016 UK EU membership referendum. Anderson campaigned on this as well as on education, crime, healthcare, and halving the foreign aid budget. 

During the campaign, he was criticised for staging a door knock while he was being filmed for a report by Channel 4 News reporter Michael Crick. Prior to the visit, Anderson was recorded on his microphone instructing a man to "make out you know who I am, that you know I'm the candidate but not that you are a friend". Will Moy of Full Fact said: "Misleading campaign techniques from parties and candidates won't only harm those who are caught out, but could damage voter confidence in our political system." Anderson criticised "nuisance tenants" in a council estate who were "making people's lives a complete misery". He suggested they should be evicted into tents in a field to pick vegetables. The Labour Party criticised Anderson's comments and compared his idea to "forced labour camps".

Anderson was one of three Conservative Party candidates investigated by the party over claims of antisemitism during the election campaign. The investigation was opened on the grounds that he was an active member of a Facebook group in which other members supported Tommy Robinson and promoted George Soros conspiracy theories. The results of the investigation were not made public, but Anderson later attended online training sessions by the Antisemitism Policy Trust charity to improve his understanding of antisemitism. He apologised for being a member of the group, and reported that he had left the group when the initial allegations were made.

Anderson was elected as the MP for Ashfield at the 2019 general election with a majority of 5,733. The seat had previously been represented by Labour's Gloria De Piero, who stood down at that election. He had previously worked as her office manager for five years. Anderson was the first Conservative to represent the constituency since the 1977 by-election.

2019–present parliamentary term 
He is a member of the Common Sense Group, an informal group of Conservative MPs which formed in the summer of 2020. Following the publication of an interim report on the connections between colonialism and National Trust properties, including links with historic slavery, Anderson was among the signatories of a letter by the group in The Telegraph in November 2020. In the letter, the signatories accused the National Trust of being "coloured by cultural Marxist dogma". In response, the All-Party Parliamentary Group Against Antisemitism issued a briefing paper to all Conservative MPs warning against using the term "cultural Marxism", as it may "inadvertently" act as a "dog-whistle for the far-right".

In the same month, Anderson attended a breakfast meeting at Downing Street with Prime Minister Boris Johnson and five other Conservative MPs. He later tested positive for COVID-19 and those who attended subsequently self-isolated. 

Anderson announced via social media in June 2021 that he would not watch any England national football team matches during the Euro 2020 tournament in protest at the players' decision to take the knee (a symbolic gesture against racism) before matches. He stated his opposition was because he felt that the action risked "alienating traditional supporters" and it supported Black Lives Matter, which in his opinion was a "political movement whose core principles aim to undermine our very way of life".

The same month, in a debate on the Police, Crime, Sentencing and Courts Bill, Anderson accused the Traveller community in Ashfield of thievery, stating, "...the Gypsy encampments that we are talking about in places such as Ashfield are not the traditional, old-fashioned Gypsies sat there playing the mandolin, flogging lucky heather and telling fortunes. The Travellers I am talking about are more likely to be seen leaving your garden shed at 3 o'clock in the morning, probably with your lawnmower and half of your tools. That happens every single time they come to Ashfield". 

In November 2021, Anderson voiced his support for offshore processing of asylum applications in the Falkland Islands and lobbied an immigration minister on the subject. In May 2022, he said that the majority of migrants crossing the English Channel illegally were economic migrants. When told that the Home Office had concluded that the majority were refugees, he blamed the "old failing asylum system" and accused the migrants of lying to falsely seek asylum. Anderson in a later interview in February 2023 commented when asked on how he would respond to the small boats migrant crisis, "I'd send them straight back the same day. I'd put them on a Royal Navy frigate or whatever and sail it to Calais, have a standoff. And they'd just stop coming".

Anderson was one of 99 Conservative MPs to vote against Covid passes in England in December 2021.

In May 2022, Anderson was criticised by opposition politicians and the food poverty campaigner Jack Monroe for suggesting in parliament that there was not a "massive" need for food banks in the UK, and their use was related to a lack of teaching on budgeting and cooking. Anderson invited opposition MPs to visit a food bank in his constituency, where he said that meals could be made for about 30p a day, and which also provided a mandatory teaching course to its users.  For these comments, he was given the nickname "30p Lee" by his critics.

The founder of the food bank, Simon Martin, commented that the teaching course was optional, and stated that "people do know how to cook, obviously, because people have been eating and surviving before we've been intervening with food parcels", but that providing free guidance on economic cooking may help. The 30p figure came from a batch-cooking session made by a team led by a professional chef which stretched an initial £50.24 shop into 172 meals. Martin commented, "It illustrates the point you can produce healthy meals [cheaply] but it's not in the capacity of every family, and not easy to replicate in every household. It presupposes you're buying in bulk, cooking with big catering trays and have the storage". Anderson later commented via social media that his comments had been misinterpreted. He said: "I did not say poor people can't cook or there is no need for food banks."

Food journalist and activist Jack Monroe hinted at legal action against Anderson after he commented in an interview that "She's taking money off some of the most vulnerable people in society and making an absolute fortune on [sic] the back of people". Monroe later instructed lawyers to start a claim against Anderson.

The following month, Anderson said that Prime Minister Boris Johnson was the victim of "a witch hunt led by the BBC", shortly after the results of a Conservative vote of confidence in Johnson's leadership was announced. In July 2022, Anderson withdrew his support for Johnson over his handling of the Chris Pincher scandal.

Anderson backed Kemi Badenoch during the July 2022 Conservative Party leadership election. After Badenoch was eliminated, he supported Liz Truss, who was ultimately successful.

In October 2022, Anderson replaced Esther McVey as chair of the Blue Collar Conservative caucus. After becoming chair, he called for the party to focus on policing and immigration policies, and lowering taxes. He was criticised by Labour MP Chris Bryant for making alleged transphobic comments about the comedian Eddie Izzard in an interview in October 2022, and Ashfield Independent Councillor David Hennigan reported Anderson to the Metropolitan Police. The Met commented that it would take no further action, as "no offences had been identified".  Anderson described Hennigan's report as a "waste of police time".

Anderson was appointed as Deputy Chairman of the Conservative Party in February 2023. In a radio interview before his appointment, Anderson said he would support the return of capital punishment where the perpetrators are clearly identifiable. Prime Minister Rishi Sunak said neither he nor the government shared Anderson's stance.

In February 2023, The Guardian reported that Michael Hollis, who runs a food bank charity, is pursuing a libel claim against Anderson. Hollis alleges that Anderson accused him in a Facebook post of exchanging cash in brown envelopes over a planning application.

GB News announced in March 2023 that Anderson would host a show on the channel.

Personal life
Anderson is married to Sinead, a Conservative councillor on Mansfield District Council who has represented the ward of Eakring since 2019. She has cystic fibrosis, and has previously received a double lung transplant for the condition. He also has two sons from a previous marriage. He was a single parent for seventeen years and, at one point, resorted to selling his car to make ends meet.

References

External links 

1967 births
British Eurosceptics
British coal miners
Conservative Party (UK) MPs for English constituencies
Living people
People from Ashfield District
UK MPs 2019–present
Labour Party (UK) councillors
Conservative Party (UK) councillors
Councillors in Nottinghamshire